Joseph Bergler the Younger (1 May 1753 – 25 June 1829) was a painter, author of numerous etchings, and director of the Prague Academy.

Bergler was born in Salzburg, the son of sculptor Joseph Bergler the Elder (1718–1788) who instructed his son. He moved to Italy in 1776 and stayed in Rome for six years. There he studied under Martin Knoller. He also became acquainted with Mengs, Hamilton and Volpato. In 1786, he returned to live with his parents in Passau. In 1800 he moved to Prague. He created altar-pieces for a number of churches in Prague and the vicinity.

During his sojourn in Rome he made a particular study of the works of Raphael. He was patronized by Cardinal Auersperg and Count Thun.  He died in Prague, aged 76.

References 

Attribution:

External links

1753 births
1829 deaths
18th-century Austrian painters
18th-century Austrian male artists
Austrian male painters
19th-century Austrian painters
19th-century Austrian male artists
19th-century Czech people
18th-century engravers
19th-century engravers
Austrian engravers
Austrian expatriates in Italy
Artists from Salzburg
Academy of Fine Arts, Prague